The Pollock-Krasner Foundation was established in 1985 for the purpose of providing financial assistance to individual working artists of established ability. It was established at the bequest of Lee Krasner, who was an American abstract expressionist painter and the widow of fellow painter Jackson Pollock. Krasner left approximately $23 million in cash, securities, and art to the foundation.

Activities
The foundation provides grants to artists internationally based on "recognizable artistic merit and demonstrable financial need". The foundation also gives out Lee Krasner Awards. These awards are based on the same criteria as grants but also recognize a lifetime of artistic achievement and are by nomination only. By 1988, the foundation had already granted over $1.5 million to about 300 "worthy artists who are in need".

Authentication board
The Pollock-Krasner Authentication Board, established by the Pollock-Krasner Foundation to examine and rule (for no charge) on disputed works, operated for six years (1990-1996) before dissolving after the completion of the Pollock catalogue raisonné. The board considered hundreds of previously unknown works but admitted only a handful. The foundation still receives legal challenges based on its inclusions and exclusions—a version of authentication in its own right.

See also
Pollock-Krasner House and Studio

References

External links
Pollock-Krasner Foundation website

Jackson Pollock
Arts foundations based in the United States
1985 establishments in New York (state)